Helmut Bergfelder (born 21 November 1946) is a former German footballer.

Bergfelder's career in the Bundesliga was only of a very short duration. On the 31st fixture date of the season in 1967–68, Willi Multhaup, manager of 1. FC Köln gave him the chance to play in a defeat against MSV Duisburg. This remained his only match in the top German league with the "FC", but he was still given the chance to play a complete 90 minutes. In 1973, Bergfelder gained promotion with Fortuna Köln to play further 32 Bundesliga matches.

Bergfelder was very active with the German amateur national team.

Honours
 DFB-Pokal: 1965–66

References

1946 births
Living people
German footballers
1. FC Köln players
1. FC Köln II players
SC Fortuna Köln players
SV Eintracht Trier 05 players
Bonner SC players
Bundesliga players
2. Bundesliga players
Association football forwards